WFMY-TV (channel 2) is a television station licensed to Greensboro, North Carolina, United States, serving as the CBS affiliate for the Piedmont Triad region. Owned by Tegna Inc., the station maintains studios on Phillips Avenue in Greensboro, and its transmitter is located in Randleman, North Carolina.

History 
 
WFMY's facility was the site of the first live television broadcast in the state of North Carolina on August 18, 1949, at 6:10 p.m. and officially signed on the air on September 22, 1949, as the second television station in North Carolina, debuting just a few months after fellow CBS affiliate WBTV in Charlotte. It was originally owned by the Greensboro News Company, publishers of the Greensboro Daily News and Daily Record (now merged as the Greensboro News & Record). The News Company had put WFMY-FM on the air in 1948, but it shut the FM station down in 1953. A new radio station would be built by different owners in 1962 on an adjacent frequency, WQMG-FM (97.1).

WFMY-TV has been a primary CBS affiliate from its sign-on, but also initially carried secondary affiliations with NBC, ABC and DuMont. NBC programming moved to WSJS-TV (channel 12, now WXII-TV) when it signed on in September 1953. WFMY also shared the ABC affiliation with WSJS until October 1963 when WGHP (channel 8, now a Fox affiliate) signed on. WFMY lost the DuMont affiliation when that network ceased operations in 1956. By the late 1950s, the station had moved to its current studio facility on Phillips Avenue, and also built a new transmitter there. In 1980, it built its current tower in Randleman.

In 1965, the News Company was bought by what eventually became Landmark Communications. The station was acquired by Harte-Hanks Communications in 1976. Harte-Hanks sold both channel 2 and Jacksonville, Florida sister station WTLV to the Gannett Company in December 1987. The deal was finalized in February 1988. This marked the group's second CBS station since 1986, the first was WUSA-TV in Washington, D.C., which had just renewed their CBS relationship.

In October 2012, Gannett entered a dispute against Dish Network regarding compensation fees and Dish's AutoHop commercial-skip feature on its Hopper digital video recorders. Gannett ordered that Dish discontinue AutoHop on the account that it is affecting advertising revenues for WFMY. Gannett threatened to pull all of its stations (such as WFMY) should the skirmish continue beyond October 7 and Dish and Gannett fail to reach an agreement. The two parties eventually reached an agreement after extending the deadline for a few hours.

On June 29, 2015, the Gannett Company split in two, with one side specializing in print media and the other side specializing in broadcast and digital media. WFMY was retained by the latter company, named Tegna.

During the analog television era, WFMY boasted one of the largest signal coverage areas in the Southeastern United States. It provided grade B coverage as far south as Charlotte and as far east as Raleigh; its transmitter is located almost halfway between the two cities. The channel 2 signal traveled a very long distance under normal conditions. It appeared in The Charlotte Observer television listings well into the 1990s, in part because it frequently aired network shows that were preempted by Charlotte's WBTV–mainly game shows and cartoons. It appeared in The News & Observer television listings well into the turn of the millennium.

Although its digital signal operates on UHF, WFMY's secondary coverage area in digital is almost as large as that of its former analog signal.

Programming 
Syndicated programming seen on WFMY-TV includes Wheel of Fortune and Jeopardy!.

WFMY's local programming, which includes the long-running news program The Good Morning Show with Lee Kinard and children's program The Old Rebel Show, preempted CBS' various attempts at morning programming from 1957 through the 1980s. WGGT (channel 48, now WMYV) aired the CBS Morning News until 1985; WFMY then began to run the program on tape delay from 8 to 10 a.m. following The Good Morning Show. Lee Kinard later moved to the station's weeknight newscasts until he retired in the 1990s. Another important local daytime program from the 1970s was Sandra and Friends, hosted by longtime news anchor Sandra Hughes. This was one of the first television programs in the region to be hosted by an African-American female.

Since March 2013, WFMY has also carried Let's Make a Deal at 10 a.m., following CBS This Morning. Prior to then, the program aired on WFMY at its recommended 3 p.m. slot, where a double-run of The Andy Griffith Show relocated after the scheduling change. In September 2016, Andy Griffith was moved to 4 p.m., switching timeslots with The Ellen DeGeneres Show.

On December 2, 2019, WFMY instituted a number of changes to its daytime schedule, moving CBS This Morning to its recommended time of 7 a.m., followed by Ellen at 9 a.m. This meant dropping the last hour of The Good Morning Show, which had been airing from 4:30 to 8 a.m. Ellen was replaced at 3 p.m. by Daily Blast Live and the daytime episode of Jeopardy!. Finally, WFMY joined WGHP and WXII with a 4 p.m. newscast, as well as replacing its 2 Wants to Know at 5:30 with another half-hour of news. All this meant that Andy Griffith is being seen only on weekends. The station also added the Saturday edition of CBS This Morning at 7 a.m. effective December 7, with the Saturday edition of The Good Morning Show airing from 5 to 7 a.m. Also in December 2019, WFMY began clearing the full hour of Face the Nation from 10:30 to 11:30 a.m. on Sundays, with In Touch following at 11:30.

On September 12, 2022, WFMY debuted a 9 a.m. version of The Good Morning Show, replacing Ellen after the show ended its run.

News operation
WFMY-TV presently broadcasts 43 hours of locally produced newscasts each week (with seven hours each weekday, three hours on Saturdays and five hours on Sundays). On January 5, 2010, beginning with its noon newscast, WFMY began broadcasting its local newscasts in widescreen standard definition; pre-recorded stories and live remote video were also presented in the format. On July 27, 2011, WFMY aired a news story claiming there had been a "series" of "violent flash mob" attacks at a downtown Greensboro park. The report made numerous allegations that were not substantiated and were subsequently refuted by the Greensboro Police Department.

On the evening of September 25, 1984, the station's Bell JetRanger news helicopter, "Sky 2", crashed while attempting to assist in the rescue of a construction worker trapped atop a water tower in Kernersville (near Winston-Salem). The tower was being dismantled when a piece of steel snapped and trapped the worker for hours, causing him to bleed profusely; "Sky 2" was called in to assist in the rescue. Pilot Tom Haroski began lowering the chopper above the tower, as an EMS worker on board was preparing to rescue the man. The chopper's tail rotor hit one of the steel beams as it hovered over the tower, sending it spiraling nose first into the ground, killing Haroski and the rescue worker instantly (it was later determined that the construction worker had bled to death before the chopper ever took off). Video of the accident was captured by competitor WXII-TV and was broadcast around the country. WFMY began using a new version of "Sky 2" (painted black) after the accident, but eventually retired the chopper altogether.

On November 13, 2011, beginning with its 11 p.m. newscast, WFMY began broadcasting its newscasts in high definition. The station also introduced a new format for its newscasts titled News 2.0. On April 25, 2013, WFMY debuted a news/investigative program, 2 Wants To Know; it replaced a third daily airing of The Andy Griffith Show in that program's longtime 5:30 p.m. slot, a move which has angered some viewers, as indicated in stories in the Greensboro News & Record and the Winston-Salem Journal.

Technical information

Subchannels 
The station's digital signal is multiplexed:

Analog-to-digital conversion 
WFMY-TV shut down its analog signal on June 12, 2009, as part of the FCC-mandated transition to digital television for full-power stations. The station's digital signal remained on its pre-transition UHF channel 51, using PSIP to display WFMY-TV's virtual channel as 2 on digital television receivers. On May 15, 2020, under the provisions of the FCC's spectrum reallocation program, WFMY's transmissions moved to channel 35, while continuing to display channel 2 as its virtual channel.

Out-of-market cable and DirecTV carriage 
In recent years, WFMY has been carried on cable in multiple areas outside of the Greensboro television market including within the Charlotte, Raleigh and Roanoke, Virginia markets. On DirecTV, WFMY has been carried in multiple areas within the Raleigh and Roanoke markets.

During the 1970s and 1980s through CATV, WFMY was once carried in Rockingham, Southern Pines, Henderson, Durham, and Roxboro in North Carolina, and Rocky Mount and Clifton Forge in Virginia.

References

External links 
Official website

1949 establishments in North Carolina
CBS network affiliates
True Crime Network affiliates
Quest (American TV network) affiliates
Twist (TV network) affiliates
Tegna Inc.
Television channels and stations established in 1949
FMY-TV
Ion Mystery affiliates
Former Gannett subsidiaries